Homidia tiantaiensis is a species of slender springtail in the family Entomobryidae. It can be found in China. It has been known to feed on Pleurotus ostreatus.

References

Collembola
Articles created by Qbugbot
Arthropods of China
Animals described in 1998